Bellugi is an Italian surname. Notable people with the surname include:

Alba Gaïa Bellugi (born 1995), French actress
Mauro Bellugi (born 1950), Italian footballer
Piero Bellugi (1924–2012), Italian conductor
Ubaldo Bellugi (1899–1992), Italian poet, writer and playwright
Ursula Bellugi (born 1931), American linguist and psychologist

Italian-language surnames